Walang Awa Kung Pumatay is a 1990 Philippine action film co-produced and directed by Junn Cabreira. The film stars Robin Padilla and Rita Avila.

Plot
Narding is the son of a policeman who was killed when he was a boy. As he grows up, Narding gets into a gang and get involved with situations and is forced to do unsavory things. He gets involved with the daughter of his boss who is later murdered. Narding is wrongly accused of the murder.

Cast
Robin Padilla as Narding
Rita Avila as Kristie
Conrad Poe as Kapitan Razon
Dick Israel as Pandong
Zandro Zamora as Don Rodrigo
Val Iglesias as Lito 
Dexter Doria as Linda
Bomber Moran
June Hidalgo as (Jun Hidalgo)
July Hidalgo
Gerry Roman
Rudy Vicdel (as Rudy Vic Del)
Rudy Ramirez
Vic Belaro
Eddie Tuazon
Honey Policarpio
Claudine Gomez
Romy Nario
Danny Riel
Danny Labra
Olive Madridejos
Boy Gomez
Eddie Del Mar
Richard Sicangco (as Li Chard Sicangco)
Johnny Ramirez (as Johnny "Boy" Ramirez)
Edward Salvador
Romy Romulo

Production Staff
Fight Director - Val Iglesias
Production Designed by - Manny Espolong and Ronaldo Cadapan
Stunt Driver - Greg Rocero
Costume Department - Dulce Crisostomo
Sound Department: Cesar Lucas (Sound Supervision), Amber Ramos (Sound Effects)

Camera and Electrical Department
Danny "Ray" Yabut Jr (as Danny Yabut) - [still photographer]
Billy Ruello (as Billy Baruelo) - [still photographer]
Butch Manlosa - [gaffer]

Film Locations
Panay Avenue QC.
Davao City, Mindanao
Obando Bulacan
Ermita Manila
Las Pinas

Theme Song
Maging Sino ka man (Sung by Rey Valera)

References

External links
 

1990 action films
Philippine action films
1990 films